Clattercote or Clattercot is a hamlet in Claydon with Clattercot civil parish, just over  north of Banbury in Oxfordshire, England.

History
In the 12th century Robert de Chesney, Bishop of Lincoln granted land at Clattercote to the Gilbertine Order, on which they founded a small priory dedicated to Saint Leonard. The priory was dissolved in 1538 in the Dissolution of the Monasteries. In 1551 King Henry VIII granted the former priory and its lands to Christ Church, Oxford. The college was still the freeholder in 1969.

The Priory seems to have had a leper's pool in which leprous inmates were bathed. Remains of a paved walk around the former pool have been discovered. By the 18th century the leper's pool was known as the "great fish pond".

The priory was extensively rebuilt as a moated farmhouse, Priory Farm. The eastern range of the farmhouse includes parts of the priory dating from late in the 13th or early in the 14th century. By 1614 the remainder of the priory had been demolished and replaced with a large L-shaped house. The central wing of this house survives but by 1717 the west wing had been demolished. The present west wing had been built in its place by 1729.

In 1777 the Oxford Canal was being extended southwards past Clattercote from Fenny Compton in Warwickshire to Cropredy in Oxfordshire, and the canal company enlarged the great fish pond to form Clattercote Reservoir to feed the canal.

In 1932 Clattercote and the neighbouring village of Claydon  to the north were incorporated into the new Claydon with Clattercot civil parish.

Sources

References

Hamlets in Oxfordshire